The Yichang–Xingshan high-speed railway, also referred to in Chinese under the acronym Yichang-Zhengwan high-speed railway connection line  (Chinese: 宜昌至郑万高铁联络线; pinyin: Yíchāng zhì zhèng wàn gāotiě liánluò xiàn), is a high-speed railway under construction between Yichang on the Wuhan–Yichang railway and Xingshan on the Zhengzhou–Wanzhou high-speed railway in Hubei province, China. It will form part of the Shanghai–Chongqing–Chengdu high-speed railway. It is a line connecting the Wuhan–Yichang railway (a component of the Shanghai–Wuhan–Chengdu passenger railway) and the Zhengzhou–Wanzhou high-speed railway. The line will run from Yichang East station via thee Changgangling area and Xiabaoping station to Xingshan station. In addition, this line is also planned to be connected with Yichang North railway station and the Wuhan–Yichang high speed railway, also currently under construction. It is expected to be officially completed and opened to traffic in 2024. After the completion of the line, combined with the Zhengzhou-Wanzhou HSR to form a new east–west high-speed railway route in the Sichuan-Chongqing area, the Wuhan–Chongqing route will be shortened from the current fastest service of 5 hours and 54 minutes to about 3 hours, and Wuhan–Chengdu services will take only 5 hours. At the same time, journeys between Yichang and Beijing will be shortened from the current 8 hours to about 4.5 hours.

History
The environmental impact assessment was announced for the first time on 5 September 2018. On 18 April 2019, the feasibility study report of the Yichang-Zhengwan high-speed railway connection line was jointly approved by China Railway and the Government of Hubei Province. On 28 December, the project officially started construction in Beidouping, Xingshan County, in the Three Gorges Reservoir Area.

On 13 August 2021, the pouring of the first beam along the entire line began.

References

High-speed railway lines in China
Rail transport in Hubei